Taqdeer is a thriller television series directed by Syed Ahmed Shawki, started streaming on the Bengali OTT platform hoichoi from 18 December 2020. Hoichoi announced their upcoming twenty-five web series, Taqdeer is one of them, Based on Bangladesh, the series features Chanchal Chowdhury, Manoj Kumar Pramanik, Sanjida Preeti and Shohel Mondol in the lead roles.

Plot

The plot of the series revolves arounds a story of a freezer van driver in Dhaka named Taqdeer (played by Chanchal Chowdhury) whose whole life turns upside down when he finds a dead body inside his van. A trail of chaotic events thereby follows which pushes Taqdeer and his best friend Montu (played by Shohel Mondol) into bigger difficulties.

Cast 
 Chanchal Chowdhury as Taqdeer
 Sanjida Preeti as Afsana Anjum
 Rikita Nandini Shimu as Josna
 Manoj Kumar Pramanik as Rana
 Shohel Mondol as Montu
 Partha Barua as Hitman
 Mir Rabbi as Shehzan Chowdhury
 Mahfuz Munna as Shohag
 Ezaz Bari as Nawab Shaheb
 Sazzad Saju as Sakib
 Nafis Ahmed as Sizar
 Shahriar Ferdous Sajib as Alal, DB-1
 Tamzid Tonmoy as Young Taqdeer
 Al Rafiul Islam Ratul as Young Montu
 Tanzim Saiyara Totini as Anika
 Intekhab Dinar as Saymon Chairman  (Special Appearance)
 Nasir Uddin Khan

Season 1 (2020)
On 6 December 2020, hoichoi released the official trailer of the web series, which created a buzz among the audience of India and Bangladesh. On 18 December 2020, hoichoi released all eight episodes of the series.

Episodes

Awards

See also
 Unoloukik
 Mohanagar
 Ladies & Gentleman
 August 14

References

External links

Indian web series
2020 web series debuts
Bengali-language web series
Bangladeshi web series
2020 in Bangladeshi television
Hoichoi original programming